Nikola Karaklajić (Cyrillic: Никола Караклајић, Belgrade, 24 February 1926 – 16 December 2008) was a Serbian-Yugoslavian chess master. He was the first notable exponent and probably inventor of the Belgrade Gambit. He won the Yugoslav Chess Championship in 1955, competed in the 12th Chess Olympiad, Belgian Chess Championship, European Team Chess Championship and played notable games with Hans Berliner, Borislav Ivkov and others as part of the peer group of strong Yugoslav players contemporary with Borislav Milić.

Aside from chess, Karaklajić was also known as a radio personality on Radio Belgrade (1957-1982) and for his interest in rock music featuring in the documentary Rockovnik. He was first editor in chief of Džuboks (i.e. Jukebox) magazine and once arranged visas for Zlatni Dečaci by representing the band members as young chess players. He organized the first concert of YU grupa and featured in YU 100: najbolji albumi jugoslovenske rok i pop muzike. His radio show Nedeljom u devet i pet (Sunday at 9:05), which he produced and hosted, introduced bands such as Samonikli.

References

1926 births
2008 deaths
Serbian chess players
20th-century chess players
Serbian magazine editors
Serbian DJs
Serbian radio personalities
Rock DJs